The Western Cape province of South Africa is governed in a parliamentary system in which the people elect the Provincial Parliament, and the parliament elects the Premier as head of the executive. The Premier leads a cabinet of provincial ministers overseeing various executive departments. The provincial government is subject to the Constitution of the Western Cape and the Constitution of South Africa, which together form the supreme law of the province.

Parliament

The Western Cape Provincial Parliament, situated in Cape Town, is the legislative branch of the provincial government. The parliament is a unicameral legislature of 42 members, elected by a system of party-list proportional representation. An election is held every five years, conventionally at the same time as the election of the National Assembly. The most recent election occurred in 2019.

Executive

The premier of the Western Cape is the head of the provincial government; chosen by the members of the provincial parliament from amongst themselves. The premier chooses a cabinet of ministers to oversee the various departments of the provincial government. The director-general is the non-political head of the provincial administration, while each government department is led by a head of department.

The current premier is Alan Winde of the Democratic Alliance and the director-general is Harry Malila. Besides the premier, the provincial cabinet consists of ten ministers overseeing thirteen departments.

Provincial Cabinet

Departments
These are the thirteen departments in the Western Cape Government:
 Department of Agriculture
 Department of Economic Development and Tourism
 Department of Community Safety
 Department of Cultural Affairs and Sport
 Department of Education
 Provincial Treasury
 Department of Health
 Department of Human Settlements
 Department of Local Government
 Department of Environmental Affairs and Development Planning
 Department of Social Development
 Department of Transport and Public Works
 Department of Premier

Judiciary

South Africa has a single national judiciary; there is no separate system of provincial courts. The Western Cape Division of the High Court of South Africa has jurisdiction over all cases arising in the province, but generally handles only the most serious or high-profile criminal trials, high-value civil trials, cases involving judicial review of legislation or executive actions, and appeals from the magistrates' courts. Judges of the High Court periodically go on circuit to hear cases in parts of the province distant from Cape Town. Appeals from the High Court are to the national Supreme Court of Appeal and ultimately (if a constitutional matter is involved) to the Constitutional Court.

The province is divided into 42 magisterial districts and 2 sub-districts, each of which is served by a district magistrate's court. There are a further 12 branch courts and 26 periodical courts to serve densely populated or geographically dispersed districts. These district courts have jurisdiction over all criminal cases except murder, rape and treason and can impose a fine of up to R100,000 or a prison sentence of up to three years; and they have jurisdiction over civil cases where the value of the claim is less than R100,000. The regional magistrate's court for the Western Cape, which sits at multiple locations in the province, has jurisdiction over all criminal cases except treason and can impose a fine of up to R300,000 or a prison sentence of up to fifteen years (or life in some circumstances). The regional court also has jurisdiction over civil cases where the value of the claim is less than R300,000, and divorce and family law cases.

Local government

The City of Cape Town metropolitan municipality is the local council for the Cape Town metropolitan area, which contains two-thirds of the province's population. The rest of the province is divided into five district municipalities which are subdivided into twenty-four local municipalities. The municipalities are listed below.

City of Cape Town
West Coast District Municipality: Matzikama Local Municipality, Cederberg Local Municipality, Bergrivier Local Municipality, Saldanha Bay Local Municipality, Swartland Local Municipality
Cape Winelands District Municipality: Witzenberg Local Municipality, Drakenstein Local Municipality, Stellenbosch Local Municipality, Breede Valley Local Municipality, Langeberg Local Municipality
Overberg District Municipality: Theewaterskloof Local Municipality, Overstrand Local Municipality, Cape Agulhas Local Municipality, Swellendam Local Municipality
Garden Route District Municipality: Kannaland Local Municipality, Hessequa Local Municipality, Mossel Bay Local Municipality, George Local Municipality, Oudtshoorn Local Municipality, Bitou Local Municipality, Knysna Local Municipality
Central Karoo District Municipality: Laingsburg Local Municipality, Prince Albert Local Municipality, Beaufort West Local Municipality

See also
 Government of South Africa
 Politics of the Western Cape

References

External links
 Western Cape Government
 Western Cape Provincial Parliament

 
Western Cape